The 1988 Ms. Olympia contest was an IFBB professional bodybuilding competition was held in 1988 in New York City, New York. It was the 9th Ms. Olympia competition held.

Results

Notable events
The song played during the posedown was Wild Side by Mötley Crüe

See also
 1988 Mr. Olympia

References

 1988 Ms. Olympia - Contest Results

External links
 Competitor History of the Ms. Olympia

Ms Olympia, 1988
Ms. Olympia

Ms. Olympia
History of female bodybuilding